Three-thousanders are mountains with a height of between , but less than  above sea level. Similar terms are commonly used for mountains of other height brackets e. g. four-thousanders or eight-thousanders. In Britain, the term may refer to mountains above .

Climatological significance 
In temperate latitudes three-thousanders play an important role, because even in summer they lie below the zero degree line for weeks.

Alpinism 
The designation "three-thousander" is often used for touristic reasons where only a few individual summits  exceed this height – e. g. in the Southern Alps, in the eastern part of Austria, in the Limestone Alps, in the Pyrenees or the rest of Europe.

The term "easy three-thousander" (Leichte Dreitausender) or "Hikable three-thousander" (Wanderdreitausender) describes mountains above  with routes that do not pose any particular challenges. Amongst the highest easy three-thousanders in the Alps are the Üsser Barrhorn in the Wallis Alps and the Monte Vioz (southern Ortler Alps). For ascents of these mountains the main risk is the lack of acclimatisation at these heights. The highest technically accessible three-thousanders in the Alps (and also the highest cable cars in Europe) are the Klein Matterhorn near Zermatt and the Aiguille du Midi on Mont Blanc.

Alps

The easternmost three-thousanders in the Alps are in the Hafner Group in the east of the High Tauern (from west to east: Großer Hafner , Lanischhafner , Lanischeck , Großer or Malteiner Sonnblick , and Mittlerer Sonnblick ). The northernmost 3,000ers are in the northern chains of the High Tauern, Zillertal, Ötztal, and Stubai Alps (as well as the Parseierspitze in the Lechtal Alps). In the eastern Alps the southern boundary lies in the Bergamo Alps (3 main summits), of the Adamello–Presanella Group (about a dozen) and the Dolomites (about 50 peaks). So the ranges of the Alps that contain mountains over the 3,000 m mark comprise roughly two thirds of the area, the 3,000er zone in the Western Alps coming much closer to the edge of the Alpin region than in the Eastern Alps with their extensive system of foothills. A large part of this sensitive, high Alpine region is protected by conservation areas, but it also forms the touristic heart of the Alps.

Switzerland, France, Austria, and Italy have many hundreds of Alpine peaks over 3,000 metres. Liechtenstein, despite being the only country lying entirely within the Alps, has no 3,000ers on its territory.

Rest of Europe 
Apart from the Alps, the dominant range in Europe – if one excludes the Caucasus, which otherwise, in Mount Elbrus (5,642 m), would have the highest mountain in the continent – only the following ranges have three-thousanders:
 Pyrenees: Pico de Aneto (3,404m), Pico Posets (3,375m), Monte Perdido (3,355m), Vignemale (3,298m), Pica d'Estats (3,143m). The Pyrenees have more than two hundred three-thousanders
 Baetic Ranges - Sierra Nevada: Mulhacén (3,482 m, highest in southwest Europe), Veleta (3,392m), with a good dozen three-thousander massifs.
 Mount Etna Sicily, Italy, 3,329m

Musala at 2,925 m, the highest mountain in southern Europe (i.e. excluding the Iberian Peninsula), does not come close to the mark. The Apennine Mountains reach 2,912 m in the Gran Sasso. The Dinaric Alps, Carpathian Mountains, Sistema Central and Cantabrian Mountains are less than 2,700 m high, and the other ranges in Europe are below 2,500 m.

See also 
Two-thousander
Four-thousander
Eight-thousander
List of Alpine three-thousanders

References 

 01
Mountains by height
Oronyms